88 Minutes is a 2007 thriller film directed by Jon Avnet and starring Al Pacino, Alicia Witt, Leelee Sobieski, William Forsythe, Deborah Kara Unger, Amy Brenneman, Neal McDonough and Benjamin McKenzie. In the film, famed forensic psychiatrist Dr. Jack Gramm (Pacino) is one of the most sought-after profilers in the world. His expert testimony resulted in the conviction of serial killer Jon Forster (McDonough). However, on the eve of Forster's execution, one of Gramm's students is murdered in a vicious copycat crime, and Gramm himself receives an ominous message informing him that he has 88 minutes to live. Filming began in the Vancouver area on October 8, 2005, and wrapped up in December 2005. In 2007 the film was released in various European countries.

In May 2007, Sony Pictures Worldwide Acquisitions Group paid $6 million to acquire North American and select international distribution rights of 88 Minutes. The group released the film in the United States theatrically on April 18, 2008, through TriStar Pictures.

Plot 
In 1997, forensic psychiatrist Dr. Jack Gramm testifies at the trial of suspected serial killer Jon Forster, dubbed "The Seattle Slayer" by police. Gramm's testimony and expert psychiatric opinion are crucial in the conviction of Forster for the attempted killing of Janie Cates and the murder of her sister Joanie, who was drugged, hanged upside down and killed after the killer invaded the sisters' apartment. Upon receiving a guilty verdict from the jury, Forster taunts Gramm, saying "Tick-tock, Doc."

Nine years later, as Forster's execution date approaches, several similar torture murders occur. Gramm, now teaching at the University of Washington, is questioned by a lawyer from the Attorney General's office as well as FBI Special Agent Frank Parks. The latest victim, Dale Morris, is revealed to be a former psychology student of Gramm's; they attended the same party the night before. On the way to his class, Gramm receives a phone call from someone using a voice changer, informing him that he has 88 minutes to live. He reports the call to his lesbian secretary, Shelly, asking for a risk assessment profile of suspects.

Gramm receives another phone threat while teaching and becomes suspicious of his students, particularly Mike Stempt. The dean of students, Carol Johnson, interrupts the class to report a bomb threat. Evacuating, Gramm finds threats written both on the classroom's overhead projector and on his car, which has been vandalized in the parking garage. Gramm is then met by his teaching assistant, Kim Cummings, who offers to help find the perpetrator. In the stairwell, Gramm encounters one of his students, Lauren Douglas, attacked by an unknown assailant and reports the assault to campus security.

Gramm and Kim go to his condo, where a package has been delivered. The package contains an audio tape of his kid sister, Kate, crying for help before being murdered. Gramm concludes that someone accessed his secure files to obtain the tape. Kim's ex-husband, Guy LaForge, appears with a gun at the apartment door, but is shot and killed from behind by an assailant masked by a motorcycle helmet. A fire alarm is triggered by the sudden onset of smoke and the shooter flees through the crowd outside. Shortly after, Gramm's car explodes, having been rigged with a bomb.

Renting a cab, Gramm explains to Kim that his sister was killed decades earlier, when he left her alone in his apartment; the crime took exactly 88 minutes. Next, Gramm and Kim visit Sara Pollard, a woman Gramm slept with the night before, but find her murdered in her apartment with evidence incriminating Gramm. Carol calls Gramm and makes comments suggesting that she is the killer, demanding that Gramm meet her at his office. Shelly arrives at Sara's apartment and advises Gramm that she suspects Lauren was the one who stole the audio tape of Kate's death. Kim disappears from the apartment and later calls Gramm with a threat similar to Carol's, also demanding he meet her at the office.

Through prison visitation records, Gramm deduces that Forster's appeals attorney "Lydia Doherty" is a pseudonym for Lauren, surmising that she set up the frame on orders from Forster. Kim calls again, instructing Gramm to come to another nearby location on campus, where he finds Carol hanging over a seventh floor balcony; Kim is tied up and gagged nearby, held at gun point by Lauren. Lauren forces Gramm to "confess" on tape that he gave false testimony at Forster's trial. Special Agent Parks arrives and shoots Lauren, causing both Carol and Lauren to partially fall from the balcony. Gramm saves Carol from completing the fall, but Lauren comes loose and plummets to her death. When Forster calls asking to speak with Lauren, Gramm informs him of Lauren's death. He quips "Tick-tock, tick-tock, you got 12 hours to live," before throwing the phone into the void. Gramm flashes back to interactions with Kate and Janie Cates, then pockets the device that recorded his "confession". He shares knowing glances with Parks and Kim before walking away.

Cast

Reception

Box office 
In its opening weekend, the film grossed $7 million in 2,168 theaters in the United States and Canada, ranking fourth at the box office and averaging $3,209 per theater. In its second weekend, the film grossed $3.6 million and fell to number eight at the box office. The film grossed $17.2 million at the US and Canadian box office and $15.4 million internationally, for a worldwide gross of $32.6 million.

Critical response 
Upon its release, 88 Minutes was universally panned by critics. Rotten Tomatoes reports that 5% of the critics gave the film positive reviews based on 124 reviews, averaging out at a 2.9/10 rating. The critical consensus states "88 Minutes is a shockingly inept psychological thriller that expertly squanders the talent at hand." The film also has a score of 17 out of 100 on Metacritic, based on 27 critics indicating "Overwhelming dislike".

The film was nominated for two Razzie Awards, Worst Actor for Al Pacino (and for Righteous Kill, also directed by Jon Avnet) and Worst Supporting Actress for Leelee Sobieski (and for In the Name of the King), but lost to Mike Myers for The Love Guru and Paris Hilton for Repo! The Genetic Opera respectively.

Home media 
88 Minutes was released on DVD on September 16, 2008, and sold 220,965 in the opening weekend. As of the seventh week, it has sold about 574,041 units which gathered revenue of $11,150,056 or more than one-third of the budget.

Remake
In May 2013, Original Entertainment confirmed to have sealed a five-picture deal with Millennium Films to produce Bollywood remakes of Rambo, The Expendables, 16 Blocks, 88 Minutes, and Brooklyn's Finest, with the productions for Rambo and The Expendables expected to start at the end of that year.

References

External links 
 
 
 
 
 

2007 films
2007 LGBT-related films
2007 psychological thriller films
2000s American films
2000s Canadian films
2000s English-language films
2000s German films
2000s serial killer films
American LGBT-related films
American psychological thriller films
American serial killer films
Canadian psychological thriller films
Canadian serial killer films
Canadian LGBT-related films
English-language Canadian films
English-language German films
German LGBT-related films
German psychological thriller films
German serial killer films
Lesbian-related films
Films about capital punishment
Films directed by Jon Avnet
Films scored by Edward Shearmur
Films set in 1997
Films set in 2006
Films set in Seattle
Films shot in Vancouver
Films with screenplays by Gary Scott Thompson
Nu Image films
TriStar Pictures films